Elgyan (Elgeen) is a rural locality (a selo), one of three settlements, in addition to Kyundyae, the administrative centre of the Rural Okrug, and Kharyalakh in Vilyuchansky Rural Okrug of Suntarsky District in the Sakha Republic, Russia. Its population as of the 2002 Census was 13.

References

Notes

Sources
Official website of the Sakha Republic. Registry of the Administrative-Territorial Divisions of the Sakha Republic. Suntarsky District. 

Rural localities in Suntarsky District